One-Punch Man: A Hero Nobody Knows is a fighting RPG video game developed by Spike Chunsoft and published by Bandai Namco Entertainment on February 28, 2020, for Microsoft Windows, PlayStation 4, and Xbox One. The game is based on the manga series One-Punch Man.

Gameplay
The game is a 3D fighting game in which one to two players battle using teams of three characters. The title character Saitama is invulnerable to other characters' attacks, and can defeat them in a single punch, but if a player picks him for their team, he will arrive late to the battle; as such, that player needs to make it through the match with the other two characters in their team until Saitama arrives. An alternative version of Saitama without these attributes, called the "Dream Version", is also playable.

Characters

 Atomic Samurai
 Boros
 Carnage Kabuto
 Child Emperor
 Crablante
 Custom Hero
 Deep Sea King
 Garou (DLC)
 Genos
 Handsome Kamen Amai Mask
 Hellish Blizzard
 "Lightning Max" Max (DLC)
 Melzargard 
 Metal Bat 
 Metal Knight 
 Mosquito Girl
 Mumen Rider
 Puri-Puri Prisoner
 Saitama
 Saitama (Dream Version)
 Silverfang
 "Snakebite" Snek
 Speed-o'-Sound Sonic
 Spring Mustachio
 Stinger
 Suiryu (DLC)
 Tank-Top Blackhole
 Tank-Top Master
 Tank-Top Tiger
 "Terrible Tornado" Tatsumaki
 Vaccine Man
 Watchdog Man (DLC)

Development
One-Punch Man: A Hero Nobody Knows was developed by Spike Chunsoft, and is based on the manga series One-Punch Man.

The game was announced in June 2019, and was released by Bandai Namco Entertainment in Japan for PlayStation 4 and Xbox One on February 27, 2020, and internationally for PlayStation 4, Xbox One, and Microsoft Windows.

On July 20, 2021, it's announced by Bandai Namco that all online servers will be closed by 2022.

Reception

The game received mixed reviews from critics, but was nominated for The Game Awards 2020 in the best fighting game category. While the story mode was praised, the gameplay and visuals were considered unpolished and too simplistic. Reviewers were polarized on the gimmick revolving around Saitama's invincibility, with some praising it for its uniqueness, and others considering it a fatally flawed concept rendering all other characters useless and making multiplayer mode completely unbalanced unless both players picked Saitama.

The physical PlayStation 4 game was the 18th highest selling physical video game in Japan during its debut week, with an estimated 4,500 copies sold; by its second week on sale, it no longer charted on Famitsu weekly top 30 sales chart.

References

External links

One-Punch Man
Bandai Namco games
2020 video games
PlayStation 4 games
Video games developed in Japan
Windows games
Xbox One games
Spike Chunsoft video games
Fighting games
Video games based on anime and manga
Video games related to anime and manga
Video games with downloadable content
Multiplayer and single-player video games
Unreal Engine games